David Orr (born 1944) is an American politician who has served as County Clerk of Cook County, acting Mayor of Chicago, and a member of Chicago City Council.

David Orr may also refer to:

 David Malcolm Orr (born 1953), UK civil engineer
 David W. Orr (born 1944), American professor of environmental studies and politics
 David Orr (journalist) (born 1974), American journalist and poetry reviewer
 David Orr (businessman) (1922–2008), Anglo-Irish businessman, philanthropist and World War II veteran

See also
 Dave Orr (1859–1915), American baseball player